Morten Risager (born 30 September 1987 in Denmark) – a Danish former speedway rider.

He earned his Speedway licence in 2003.

He announced his retirement in January 2018.

Clubs career
Polish league:
Intar Lazur Ostrów Wlkp. (?)
Swedish league:
Smederna Eskilstuna (?)
British leagues:
Coventry Bees (2004–2006)
Eastbourne Eagles (2007)
Peterborough Panthers (2008)
Ipswich Witches (2009-2014)
Plymouth Devils (2015)
Danish league:
Slangerup (?)
Fredericia (?)

Speedway Grand Prix

Honours
Individual U-21 World Championship:
2005 – track reserve
2007 – 8 place (8 points)
Team U-21 World Championship:
2005 – Bronze medal (10 points)
2006 – Bronze medal (4 points)
2007 – 5 place – 2nd in Semi-Final B (9 points)
2008 – Silver medal (4 points)
Individual U-19 European Championship:
2004 – Bronze medal
2006 – injury before Final
Individual Danish Championship:
2004 – 10 place2005 – 6 place
Individual U-21 Danish Championship:
2003 – 9 place
2004 – Bronze medal
2005 – Silver medal
2006 – Silver medal

See also
Denmark speedway team

References

External links
(da) (en) Official Site

1987 births
Living people
Danish speedway riders
Coventry Bees riders
Eastbourne Eagles riders
Peterborough Panthers riders
Wolverhampton Wolves riders